The 2015–16 season was PFC CSKA Sofia's 1st season in the Bulgarian V Football Group. CSKA started the 2015/2016 season in V group (3rd division) as they did not receive a licence to play in A group due to unpaid debts. CSKA finished in first place in the standings. This article shows player statistics and all matches (official and friendly) that the club will play during the 2015–16 season.

Players

Squad stats 

|-
|colspan="14"|Players sold or loaned out after the start of the season:

|}
As of 29 May 2016

Players in/out

Summer transfers 

In:

Out:

Winter transfers 

In:

Out:

Pre-season and friendlies

Competitions

V Group

Table

Results summary

Results by round

Fixtures and results

Bulgarian Cup

Amateur Cup 

On 24 September CSKA was drawn to play against Vitosha Bistritsa for the BAFL Cup. However, several hours after the draw the club cancelled its participation, citing its growing problems with injured and exhausted players. In doing so, CSKA will be fined with 700 BGN for its refusal of participation.

See also 
PFC CSKA Sofia

References

External links 
CSKA Official Site
CSKA Fan Page with up-to-date information
Bulgarian A Professional Football Group
UEFA Profile

PFC CSKA Sofia seasons
Cska Sofia